Georgi Iliev, nicknamed The Michael (born 15 September 1956) is a retired Bulgarian footballer and manager.

Career

In his career, Iliev played for Sliven, CSKA Sofia, Slavia Sofia, Loko Sofia and Dunav Ruse. With CSKA Sofia, he won 4 A PFG titles between 1980 and 1983 and was also Bulgarian Cup holder twice – in 1981 and 1983. Iliev managed the "armymen" from 1990 to 1993.

He is also a businessman. Iliev is married to Elizabeth and they have three sons – George, Georg and Georgi.

References

1956 births
Living people
Bulgarian footballers
Bulgaria international footballers
Association football defenders
OFC Sliven 2000 players
PFC CSKA Sofia players
FC Dunav Ruse players
PFC Slavia Sofia players
FC Lokomotiv 1929 Sofia players
IF Elfsborg players
First Professional Football League (Bulgaria) players
Expatriate footballers in Sweden